The boat-billed tody-tyrant (Hemitriccus josephinae) is a species of bird in the family Tyrannidae, the tyrant flycatchers.
It is found in the Guianas in French Guiana, Suriname, and eastern Guyana; also in northeast Brazil's Amazon Basin in the states of Pará, Amapá, and northeastern Amazonas.

Its natural habitat is subtropical or tropical moist lowland forests.

References

External links
"Boat-billed tody-tyrant" photo gallery VIREO Photo-High Res

boat-billed today-tyrant
Birds of the Guianas
Birds of the Amazon Basin
boat-billed today-tyrant
Taxonomy articles created by Polbot